Edwin Wakelin (18 October 1880 – 13 August 1925) was an English first-class cricketer who played in one match for Worcestershire against Essex in 1910; he scored 6 in his only innings before being dismissed by Walter Mead.

Wakelin was born in Cowley St John, Oxford; he died aged just 44 in St Giles, also in Oxford.

External links
 

1880 births
1925 deaths
English cricketers
Worcestershire cricketers
Oxfordshire cricketers